Goukhothang, Raja (–1872) was a prince from the Guite family of Zomi also known as Tedim Chin in Myanmar (Burma) and Paite in India.  He was known as the then leader of all Zo people as Carey and Tuck also noted him as the Yo (correct Zo people) Chief of Mwelpi (correct Mualpi) he was later capture by meetei Maharaj Chandrakirti and died in Imphal jail unconditionally. According to his documentary video presentation released in 2006, he was born in Tedim-Lamzang of present Chin State (Myanmar-Burma), one of the then political centers of the Guite dynasty. He succeeded his father, his lordship Prince Mang Suum II, in 1855, and moved the capital to fortified city of Mualpi of present Tonzang township of Chin State. In commemoration of his lordship, a football tournament is bi-annually held in Lamka (Churachandpur) by Ropiang Foundation Trust.

Footnotes

External links
 SSPP
Laizoms Musika

1872 deaths
People from Manipur
Year of birth uncertain
19th-century Indian royalty